Anthony Biddle may refer to:

 Anthony Joseph Drexel Biddle (1876–1948), American philanthropist; person on whom the film The Happiest Millionaire was based
 Anthony Joseph Drexel Biddle, Jr. (1897–1961), American diplomat
 Anthony Biddle (Paralympian) (born 1975), Australian Paralympic athlete and cyclist